Kimiko Kurihara  is a Japanese politician.

Early life and education 
Kurihara was born on January 13, 1946, in Kumano, Hiroshima. When she was in her 20s she delivered newspapers and milk while raising three children.

Career 
In 1975 Kurihara was elected to serve in the legislature for Kumano. She was elected to the House of Councilors in 1992, running on a campaign platform opposing the overseas deployment of the Japanese National Self-Defense Forces. She ran as a member of the Japanese Socialist Party. After her term ended she ran for her old seat, but was not reelected.

References 

1946 births
Living people
Japanese politicians